The 1933 NCAA baseball season, play of college baseball in the United States organized by the National Collegiate Athletic Association (NCAA) began in the spring of 1933.  Play largely consisted of regional matchups, some organized by conferences, and ended in June.  No national championship event was held until 1947.

Conference changes
12 schools left the Southern Conference to form the Southeastern Conference for the 1933 season.  The teams were: Alabama, Auburn, Florida, Georgia, Georgia Tech, Kentucky, LSU, Mississippi State, Ole Miss, Tennessee, Tulane, and Vanderbilt.  A limited, unbalanced schedule was implemented for 1933.

Conference winners
This is a partial list of conference champions from the 1933 season.

Conference standings
The following is an incomplete list of conference standings:

References

1933 in American sports
1933 in baseball
College baseball seasons in the United States